Hippies is a six-part British television comedy series broadcast on BBC 2 from 12 November to 17 December 1999. It was created by Arthur Mathews and Graham Linehan, the writing partnership most famous for Father Ted, but the scripts were written by Mathews alone. It starred Simon Pegg, Sally Phillips, Julian Rhind-Tutt and Darren Boyd.

Synopsis 
Hippies is set in 1969 during the 'Swinging Sixties' and follows the misadventures of Ray Purbbs (Pegg), who is the editor of a counterculture magazine called Mouth (a parody of Oz and International Times), which he produces in his flat in Notting Hill Gate. He is aided by Alex Picton-Dinch (Rhind-Tutt), Hugo Yemp (Boyd) and Jill Sprint (Phillips). Ray is constantly pining for Sprint to no avail.

The series delves into late 1960s culture and involves the characters in various socially awkward situations in this setting.

Episodes

Critical reaction
The series was Mathews and Linehan's immediate follow up to the hugely popular and highly successful Father Ted. As such it received a significant amount of pre-release hype which viewers felt let down by after watching the first few episodes, as it did not meet their expectations. In general it was badly received by critics but has gained a cult following.

A second series was commissioned, but was never made after Mathews was put off by the negative critical reaction.

Hippies has never been repeated on any terrestrial BBC channels, although it has been repeated on Paramount Comedy 2, the now defunct Play UK, and Gold.

BBC America aired the series in the United States in 2000.

The series was released on Region 0 DVD in the UK in March 2008.

External links 
 
 
 BBC comedy guide entry
 Article on Off The Telly

1999 British television series debuts
1999 British television series endings
1990s British sitcoms
BBC television sitcoms
1990s British satirical television series
English-language television shows
Television series created by Graham Linehan
Television series by Fremantle (company)
Television shows set in London
Television series set in 1969